Garzin Kheyl (also Romanized as Garzīn Kheyl; also known as Garzīneh Kheyl) is a village in Rastupey Rural District, in the Central District of Savadkuh County, Mazandaran Province, Iran. At the 2006 census, its population was 23, in 7 families.

References 

Populated places in Savadkuh County